Nattfödd is the third studio album by the Finnish folk metal band Finntroll. It was released on April 19, 2004 by Spinefarm Records in Finland and by Century Media outside.

Nattfödd marks a change in the musical direction of Finntroll, as they drift into a slightly slower, less frenzied sound that is reminiscent of some songs from their first album, Midnattens widunder. It also incorporates some of the acoustic and ambient elements from their previous album, Visor om slutet, though is largely a return to the band's black and folk metal roots.

A special edition of the album includes the EP Trollhammaren as a bonus disc.

Track listing

Tracks 1, 8 and 9 lyrics and music by Trollhorn.
Tracks 2-4 and 6 lyrics by Wilska, music by Trollhorn/Tundra.
Track 5 lyrics by Wilska, music by Trollhorn.
Track 7 lyrics by Trollhorn, music by Routa/Trollhorn/Tundra.
Track 10 music by Routa.

Personnel 
Mikael "Routa" Karlbom – guitar
Samuli "Skrymer" Ponsimaa – guitar
Samu "Beast Dominator" Ruotsalainen – drums
Henri "Trollhorn" Sorvali – keyboards
Sami "Tundra" Uusitalo – bass
Tapio Wilska – vocals

References

Finntroll albums
2004 albums
Century Media Records albums